Hans-Joachim Schäfers (born 1957) is a German surgeon, as well as cardiac, thoracic, and vascular surgeon and university professor. He is director of the department of Thoracic and Cardiovascular Surgery at the Saarland University Medical Center in Homburg/Saar, Germany. He is known for his activities in aortic valve repair, aortic surgery, and pulmonary endarterectomy.

Biography 
Hans-Joachim Schäfers went to medical school from 1976 to 1982 at the University of Essen. He received his doctoral title in 1982 magna cum laude. After his military service he started his surgical training at the Hannover Medical School (Medizinische Hochschule Hannover). He added a 1-year clinical fellowship at the Toronto General Hospital, Department of Thoracic Surgery of the University of Toronto to study lung transplantation. In 1991 he was appointed staff surgeon in the Department of Thoracic and Cardiovascular Surgery at the Hannover Medical School. He achieved his habilitation in 1992.

In 1995, he assumed as interim director the leadership of the Department of Thoracic and Cardiovascular at the Saarland University Medical Center in Homburg/Saar. In April 1996, he was formally appointed director of the department and Professor of Surgery. He has assumed different obligations in academic committees, and he has initiated many research projects dealing with cardiac and thoracic surgical challenges. Apart from his wide surgical spectrum in cardiac and thoracic surgery his areas of core competence include operations for aortic aneurysms (especially thoracic aortic aneurysms), surgery for pulmonary hypertension, heart valve reconstruction, and in particular aortic valve reconstruction.

Scientific contribution 
The initial research activities of Hans-Joachim Schäfers focused on different clinical problems of heart and lung transplantation. During his fellowship at the University of Toronto (grant of the German Research Council) he investigated the problem of bronchial complications after lung transplantation. Both in Hannover and Homburg he initiated important research projects to minimize bronchial complications and to minimize ischemia-reperfusion injury after lung transplantation. Later projects deal with special aspects of functional mitral regurgitation and aortic surgery. Further research attempted to clarify the mechanisms of intestinal perfusion problems after cardiac surgery and the etiology of aortic aneurysms in the presence of congenital aortic valve malformations, in particular bicuspid aortic valves and unicuspid aortic valves. He developed approaches to improve the concept of pulmonary endarterectomy  for thromboembolic pulmonary hypertension. In the past 20 years he has focused on the development and improvement of techniques for aortic valve repair. The concept has been adopted by other surgeons.

Publications 

 Hans-Joachim Schäfers: Current treatment of aortic regurgitation (UNI-MED Science) (English) (2013)
 Hans-Joachim Schäfers (ed.): Klinische Grundlagen der Herz- und Thoraxchirurgie (2011)
 Jürgen Haase, Hans-Joachim Schäfers, Horst Sievert, Ron Waksman (eds.): Cardiovascular Interventions in Clinical Practice (English) (2010)
 Hans-Joachim Schäfers: Current Treatment of Mitral Regurgitation (English) (2010)

References 

German vascular surgeons
1957 births
Living people
German cardiac surgeons